Manitoba Provincial Road 303 (PR 303) is a short provincial road in the Canadian province of Manitoba.

Route description
PR 303 starts as a paved road at Provincial Trunk Highway (PTH) 12 south of Steinbach and runs east for approximately  until it reaches the settlement of Friedensfeld.  The route continues east as a gravel road for  before ending at PR 302 in the Rural Municipality (RM) of La Broquerie.

The former sections of PR 303 are now municipal roads known as Ridge Road, a paved two-lane highway in the RM of Hanover, and Road 34N (College Avenue in the RM of Hanover and Otterburne Road in the RM of De Salaberry), part of which is also a paved two-lane highway (PTH 59 west to Otterburne).

References

External links
Official Manitoba Highway Map

303